Esfandiar Hosseini was an Iranian military officer who served as the Commander of the Islamic Republic of Iran Navy from 1983 to 1985. 

Hosseini was appointed to the position on 30 April 1983 and served in the capacity until 25 June 1985, when he resigned for unknown reasons.

Personal life
Hosseini was a non-religious person and married to an Italian woman.

See also
 List of Iranian commanders in the Iran–Iraq War

References

Commanders of Islamic Republic of Iran Navy
Islamic Republic of Iran Army personnel of the Iran–Iraq War